Francisco Antonio Arcia (born September 14, 1989) is a Venezuelan professional baseball catcher in the Washington Nationals organization. He previously played in Major League Baseball (MLB) for the Los Angeles Angels.

Career

New York Yankees

On May 8, 2007, the New York Yankees signed Arcia as an international free agent to a minor league contract. He made his professional debut for the DSL Yankees. He spent the 2008 and 2009 seasons with the rookie ball GCL Yankees, hitting .128 and .247 respectively. He split the 2010 season between the Single-A Charleston RiverDogs and the Low-A Staten Island Yankees, accumulating a .255/.313/.349 batting line between the clubs. He remained in Charleston for the 2011 season, but only appeared in 3 games. In 2012, Arcia again remained in Charleston, batting .246/.319/.384 in 68 games. He split the 2013 season between the High-A Tampa Yankees and the Double-A Trenton Thunder, slashing .213/.286/.305 between the two teams. He spent 2014 with Trenton and the Triple-A Scranton/Wilkes-Barre RailRiders, batting .276/.311/.347 in 64 games. He was invited to Spring Training for the 2015 season but did not make the club and was assigned to Trenton, where he batted .248/.325/.319 before electing free agency on November 6, 2015.

Miami Marlins
On November 18, 2015, he signed a minor league contract with the Miami Marlins organization. He split the season between the Triple-A New Orleans Zephyrs and the Double-A Jacksonville Suns, slashing .228/.307/.283 before he elected free agency on November 7, 2016.

Los Angeles Angels
On November 17, 2016, Arcia signed a minor league contract with the Los Angeles Angels organization. He split the 2017 season between the Triple-A Salt Lake Bees and the Double-A Mobile BayBears, hitting .220/.318/.250 in 43 games. He was assigned to Salt Lake to begin the 2018 season.

The Angels promoted Arcia to the major leagues on July 26, 2018, after spending 12 years in the minor leagues, and he made his major league debut that same day. Arcia's first major league hit, a three-run home run in the seventh, came on the same day. After his second major league game on July 28, 2018, Arcia became the first player in history to record 10 RBI's in his first two games. On August 11, Arcia became the first Angels position player to pitch in a game since Chili Davis did so in 1993. On September 20, Arcia became the first player in major league history to catch, pitch, and hit a home run in the same game. He finished his rookie year with a .204/.226/.427 slash line with 6 home runs and 23 RBI in 41 games.

On November 2, 2018, Arcia was outrighted off of the 40-man roster and elected free agency.

Chicago Cubs
On December 19, 2018, Arcia signed a minor-league contract with the Chicago Cubs. He was assigned to the Triple-A Iowa Cubs, but was released on July 18, 2019, after mustering a .181 average in 51 games.

New York Yankees (second stint)
On July 23, 2019, Arcia signed a minor league contract with the New York Yankees and was assigned to the Double-A Trenton Thunder. Between Trenton and Triple-A Scranton/Wilkes-Barre, Arcia batted .192 and .289. He became a free agent on November 4, 2019.

Los Angeles Angels (second stint)
On February 6, 2020, Arcia signed a minor league deal with the Los Angeles Angels organization. He did not play in a game in 2020 due to the cancellation of the minor league season because of the COVID-19 pandemic. On September 6, 2020, Arcia was added to the Angels 60-man player pool but did not get called up and elected free agency on November 2.

On March 5, 2021, Arcia signed with the West Virginia Power of the Atlantic League of Professional Baseball. However, on May 5, before the ALPB season began, Arcia signed a minor league contract with the Los Angeles Angels. He played in 10 games with the Triple-A Salt Lake Bees, going 10-for-28 with no home runs and 2 RBI before being released on July 10.

Sultanes de Monterrey
On July 14, 2021, Arcia signed with the Sultanes de Monterrey of the Mexican League. In 16 games, he slashed .235/.350/.294 with 6 RBIs. Arcia was released on August 21, 2021.

West Virginia Power
On August 22, 2021, Arcia signed with the West Virginia Power of the Atlantic League of Professional Baseball. He became a free agent following the season.

Tecolotes de los Dos Laredos
On April 6, 2022, Arcia signed with the Tecolotes de los Dos Laredos of the Mexican League. He played in 64 games for Dos Laredos, hitting .298/.398/.351 with no home runs and 22 RBI.

On August 26, 2022, Arcia signed with the Wild Health Genomes of the Atlantic League of Professional Baseball. He did not make an appearance for the Genomes and was released on September 8. His rights were later returned to Dos Laredos, but he was released from his contract prior to the 2023 season on March 6, 2023.

Washington Nationals
On March 7, 2023, Arcia signed a minor league contract with the Washington Nationals organization.

References

External links

Living people
1989 births
Major League Baseball players from Venezuela
Venezuelan expatriate baseball players in the United States
Major League Baseball catchers
Los Angeles Angels players
Dominican Summer League Yankees players
Venezuelan expatriate baseball players in the Dominican Republic
Gulf Coast Yankees players
Staten Island Yankees players
Charleston RiverDogs players
Águilas del Zulia players
Tampa Yankees players
Trenton Thunder players
Scranton/Wilkes-Barre RailRiders players
Jacksonville Suns players
New Orleans Zephyrs players
Mobile BayBears players
Salt Lake Bees players
Tigres de Aragua players
Cardenales de Lara players
Iowa Cubs players
Tecolotes de los Dos Laredos players